The 2012–13 Stuttgarter Kickers season is the 113th season in the club's football history. In 2012–13 the club plays in the 3. Liga, the third tier of German football. It is the club's first season back in this league, having been promoted from the Regionalliga in 2012. The club also takes part in the 2012–13 edition of the Württemberg Cup.

Review and events

Matches

Legend

Friendly matches

3. Liga

League fixtures and results

Tables

League table

Summary table

Württemberg Cup

Squad information

Squad and statistics

Goal scorers

All competitions

3. Liga

Württemberg Cup

|-
|- align="left" style="background:#DCDCDC"
| colspan="12"|Last updated: 24 October 2013
|-

Penalties

All competitions

3. Liga

Württemberg Cup

|-
|()* = Penalties saved
|- align="left" style="background:#DCDCDC"
| colspan="12"|Last updated: 24 October 2013
|-

Transfers

In

Out

Reserve team
Kickers' reserve team finished 14th in the Oberliga Baden-Württemberg and were coached by Jürgen Hartmann.

Sources

Match reports

Other sources

External links
 Stuttgarter Kickers season at Kickersarchiv.de 
 2012–13 Stuttgarter Kickers season at Weltfussball.de 
 2012–13 Stuttgarter Kickers season at kicker.de 
 2012–13 Stuttgarter Kickers season at Fussballdaten.de 

Stuttgarter Kickers
Stuttgarter Kickers seasons